Tackett (also spelled Tackitt) is a surname of French origin. Notable people with the surname include:

Boyd Anderson Tackett, 20th-century American politician in Arkansas
E. J. Tackett, American ten-pin bowler
Pleasant Tackitt, 19th-century American politician in Texas
Mann Darius Tackitt, brother of Pleasant
Marnesba Tackett, American civil rights activist

References